Street Outlaws is an American reality television series. The series premiered on Discovery Channel on June 10, 2013. The show was renewed for a thirteenth season which premiered on April 1, 2019.

Episodes

Series overview

Season 1 (2013)

Season 2 (2013–14)

Season 3 (2014)

Season 4 (2014–15)

Season 5 (2015)

Season 6 (2015)

Season 7 (2016)

Season 8 (2016)

Season 9 (2017)

No Prep Kings 1 (2018)

Fastest In America (2020-)
In this spin-off, 8 teams in the U.S. descend on cities to compete for the biggest street race.

Harry Allen Generating Station Fatal Incident
During filming on August 7, 2022 into the morning of August 8, Ryan Fellows' gold Nissan S30 bodied car (known as a "Datsun 240Z" when sold in the United States) was involved in crash during filming of the fourth season of Street Outlaws: Fastest In America  on Las Vegas Boulevard near the Harry Allen Generating Station.  The vehicle was involved in a crash, rolled over and burst into flames in Las Vegas, killing the driver, in the race.

According to Sinclair News affiliate KSNV reports, Warner Bros. Discovery and Pilgrim Media Group (producers) had not authorised a film permit but had a Nevada Department of Transportation permit to close the street for filming.

The incident reignited a controversy from 2015, when the National Hot Rod Association threatened to revoke licences of competitors who participate in Street Outlaws.  NHRA events, held on closed circuits, have necessary crash walls and catch fencing, along with rescue times at proper points.  Street Outlaws shows filmed on streets do not have barriers and it is unknown if safety crews are on the level of the NHRA Safety Safari.

Video games 

A racing video game based on the series, Street Outlaws: The List, was released for Nintendo Switch, PlayStation 4, and Xbox One on October 22, 2019, and for Microsoft Windows on November 29, 2019. It was developed by Team6 Game Studios and published by GameMill Entertainment in North America and Maximum Games in Europe. Switch Player gave the game 2 out of 5 stars and summarized that "Street Outlaws: The List is a total drag. Not only is the racing boring to the level of watching paint dry, but the mechanical upgrading of vehicles is complex for those who aren’t knowledgeable about cars. Only devout fans of the show or hardcore racing fans will find pleasure here."

A sequel, Street Outlaws 2: Winner Takes All, was released for PlayStation 4, PlayStation 5, Xbox One, Xbox Series X/S, and Nintendo Switch on September 21, 2021, and for Microsoft Windows on December 3, 2021.

References

External links
 
Street Outlaws No Prep Kings
No Prep Racing

2010s American reality television series
2013 American television series debuts
Discovery Channel original programming
Television shows adapted into video games